Tracy is the second most populated city in San Joaquin County, California, United States. The population was 93,000 at the 2020 census. Tracy is located inside a geographic triangle formed by Interstate 205 on the north side of the city, Interstate 5 to the east, and Interstate 580 to the southwest.

History

Until the 1760s, the area that is now the city of Tracy was long populated by the Yokuts ethnic group of loosely associated bands of Native Americans and their ancestors. They lived on hunting and gathering foods, game and fish from the area, including its local rivers and creeks. After encountering the Spanish colonists, the Yokuts suffered from new infectious diseases, which caused social disruption, as did the Spanish efforts to impress them for labor at missions, specifically Mission San Jose. Mexican and American explorers later came into the area, pushing the Yokuts out. The Yokuts people are still around to this day and live in small groups with a total of about 2,600 people identifying under the Yokuts name. Along with the Yokuts, another language group of Native Americans found near the Tracy area are referred to as the Mono. Today the Mono peoples numbers are around 1,800 people.

Tracy is a railroad town that came from the mid-19th century construction, mainly by Chinese laborers, of Central Pacific Railroad rail lines running from Sacramento through Stockton to the San Francisco Bay Area, beginning 1868 and ending September 1878 with the opening of a new branch and junction. A number of small communities sprang up along these lines at designated station sites, including one at the junction named for railroad director J. J. Tracy.

Incorporated in 1911, Tracy grew rapidly and prospered as the center of an agricultural area, even when larger railroad operations began to decline in the 1950s. Competition with trucking and automobiles resulted in widespread railroad restructuring.  Tracy is part of the San Jose-San Francisco-Oakland, CA Combined Statistical Area, an extension of the Bay Area.

In December 1969, the town of Tracy was the host of the Altamont Free Concert, held at the (now closed) Altamont Raceway Park.  An estimated 300,000 people gathered at the speedway infield in an event that was plagued by violence among attendees, many of whom were drunk or drugged. Artists featured included the internationally known Rolling Stones and the California bands Santana, Jefferson Airplane, the Flying Burrito Brothers and Crosby, Stills, Nash & Young.

Tracy was the headquarters of a branch of the American Nazi Party. Increased activity was reported by the media in 1972, with the appearance of graffiti spray-painted Nazi swastikas and the words "White Power". A surplus army 2½-ton 6×6 truck with swastika symbols was seen carrying neo-Nazi recruits around town. Members handed out flyers printed with "Join the National Socialist White People’s Party" and a Tracy-based post office box mailing address. The television program 60 Minutes aired a report in 1978 titled "The California Reich" which contained an interview of a Tracy resident who was a neo-Nazi leader. After about a decade, most of the city's neo-Nazis moved to Oroville, California.

Geography

Located in the Central Valley, Tracy is near both fertile and (due to a region of hills west of Tracy) infertile agricultural lands. Tracy has a Mediterranean climate.

Some of this land (in the east and mostly north of Tracy because of the moist Delta river system) has come under increasing development pressure. The San Francisco Bay Area's vigorous population growth has spilled over into the Tracy area as well as other locations, such as the new town of Mountain House. Tracy passed Measure A in 1990 in an attempt to contain and limit development.

In an effort to reduce environmental impacts of the city, it launched the Emerald Tracy Project in September 2009. City spokesman Matt Robinson said that if it succeeds, Tracy will be the second city after Riverside, California to satisfy the state's goal for sustainable communities.

Tire fire, south of Tracy
On August 7, 1998, a tire fire ignited at S.F. Royster's Tire Disposal south of Tracy at 29425 South MacArthur Drive, near Linne Road. The tire dump held more than 7 million illegally stored tires and was allowed to burn for over two years before it was extinguished. Allowing the fire to burn was considered to be a better way to avoid groundwater contamination than putting it out. The cleanup of chemicals released by the fire cost $16.2 million. The chemicals were found to have contaminated groundwater in the region.

Climate

Tracy is marked by a semi-arid climate (Köppen BSh), with cool, moist winters and very hot and dry summers,  displaying Mediterranean characteristics. December and January are the coolest months, and average around 47.1 °F (8.4 °C), and there are 19 nights with lows at or below freezing annually, with the coldest night of the year typically bottoming out below 30 °F (−1.1 °C). July is the warmest month, averaging 76.4 °F (28.3 °C); normally, there are 18 days of 100 °F (37.8 °C)+ highs and 82 days of 90 °F (32.2 °C)+ highs. Average annual precipitation is around 12.5 inches (317.7 mm), which, by definition, results in the area being classified as a semi-desert.

Demographics

The 2010 United States Census reported that Tracy had a population of 82,922. The racial makeup of Tracy was 43,724 (52.7%) White, 5,953 (7.2%) African American, 715 (0.9%) Native American, 12,229 (14.7%) Asian, 747 (0.9%) Pacific Islander, 13,173 (15.9%) from other races, and 6,381 (7.7%) from two or more races. Hispanic or Latino of any race were 30,557 persons (36.9%).

The Census reported that 82,606 people (99.6% of the population) lived in households, 69 (0.1%) lived in non-institutionalized group quarters, and 247 (0.3%) were institutionalized.

There were 24,331 households, out of which 13,143 (54.0%) had children under the age of 18 living in them, 15,122 (62.2%) were opposite-sex married couples living together, 3,196 (13.1%) had a female householder with no husband present, and 1,627 (6.7%) had a male householder with no wife present.  There were 1,501 (6.2%) unmarried opposite-sex partnerships, and 184 (0.8%) same-sex married couples or partnerships. 3,326 households (13.7%) were made up of individuals, and 1,026 (4.2%) had someone living alone who was 65 years of age or older. The average household size was 3.40.  There were 19,945 families (82.0% of all households); the average family size was 3.72.

The population was spread out, with 26,668 people (32.2%) under the age of 18, 7,476 people (9.0%) aged 18 to 24, 23,826 people (28.7%) aged 25 to 44, 19,202 people (23.2%) aged 45 to 64, and 5,750 people (6.9%) who were 65 years of age or older.  The median age was 32.3 years. For every 100 females, there were 98.3 males.  For every 100 females age 18 and over, there were 94.9 males.

The homeowner vacancy rate was 2.5%; the rental vacancy rate was 5.9%.  54,275 people (65.5% of the population) lived in owner-occupied housing units and 28,331 people (34.2%) lived in rental housing units.

Arts and culture

Historical Monuments 
Tracy City Hall and Jail was first commissioned by the city in November–December 1899 and completed in March 1900 after the original Jail and city hall was burnt down. This historical site served as the local governments place of operation during Tracy's formative years, which makes this building an integral part of Tracy's foundation. The structure is made of a simple brick building that is 24 by 43 feet in dimension located on 25 West Seventh Street, and was built by J.F. Hoerl. In the historical resources inventory, the Tracy City Hall and Jail was one of only fourteen buildings to receive and "exceptional" rating.

The Tracy Inn was originally opened in 1927 with a total of 60 rooms on the second floor and is still located on 24 West Eleventh Street. The building has a very transitional architectural style befitting the 1920s with a classic Spanish Colonial revival and modern styles mixed together. The building was designed by the Oakland firm of Slocomhe and Tuttle. In 1949, after the ownership changed, the Tracy Inn suffered with a fire that burned the only original blue prints of the building. Even with this loss the owner was still able to recreate the original look of the Tracy Inn. The iconic sign of the Tracy Inn has also been replaced in 1945.

Government

The United States Postal Service operates the Tracy Post Office and the Tracy Carrier Annex.

The California Department of Corrections and Rehabilitation operates the Deuel Vocational Institution, a state prison, in unincorporated San Joaquin County, near Tracy.

The Tracy Defense Distribution Depot began its operations back in 1942, and has since been a main supply for American troops for all major wars since World War II. The distribution depot has around 30 warehouses and is a major employer for the area, just under Safeway.

Education
Three public school districts serve the city of Tracy. The largest and most recognized is the Tracy Unified School District. This school system incorporates many elementary and middle schools as well as five Tracy high schools: Tracy High School, Merrill F. West High School, Delta Charter High School, Millennium Charter High School and John C. Kimball High School.

Tracy's students with behavioral issues attend the Willow Community Day School, and the Tracy One Program, or Community One. The other two school districts are: Lammersville Joint Unified School District, which includes six K-8 schools (Peter Hansen Elementary, Julius Cordes Elementary, Wicklund Elementary, Bethany Elementary, Questa Elementary, and Altamont Elementary) along with Mountain House High School, which was opened in 2014. and Jefferson School District. The latter covers the south side of Tracy and includes four schools: Jefferson Middle School, Tom Hawkins Elementary School, Monticello Elementary School and Anthony C. Traina School.

Media
Tracy's daily newspaper is the Tracy Press, a once-weekly newspaper. Bilingual Weekly News covers Tracy in English and Spanish.

Infrastructure

Transportation

Public transportation
Tracy is served by several bus services: locally, Tracer runs seven lines that serve as circulators between major transit hubs, shopping, school, residential, and downtown areas. San Joaquin Regional Transit District (SJRTD) runs two county hopper routes that connect the city with other San Joaquin County communities and one commuter route that run to Dublin/Pleasanton BART station.

Greyhound, Tracer, and SJRTD all connect with taxis, bike stations, and parking at the Tracy Transit Center, a transit station built in 2010.

Amtrak Thruway buses connect serve the city's bus station to the area with six daily trips to the South Bay and two to San Francisco, all of which stop at BART and job centers in Livermore.

To meet the future transportation needs, which will connect San Joaquin Valley with the Bay Area, there are two Transit Stations in Tracy. One is located downtown and is designated for bus service, but is being considered as a possible site for California High-Speed Rail.

South Tracy offers the Altamont Corridor Express (ACE) service at Tracy (ACE station), which provides commuter rail transportation to the Bay Area and connects with VTA in San Jose, BART via shuttle in Pleasanton and Fremont, in addition to Amtrak train in Santa Clara and San Jose.

Major highways
Interstate 205 passes along the north side of the city and connects the nearby Interstates 580 to the west and 5 on the east, with the three Interstates forming a triangle around much of the city. Business Loop 205 runs through the center of Tracy along 11th Street, formerly a portion of U.S. Highway 50. In addition, the northern terminus of State Highway 33 is located at South Bird Road and Interstate 5 southeast of Tracy.

Aviation
Tracy is served by Tracy Municipal Airport, located south of the city. It serves general aviation; there is no scheduled airline service from the airport.

Notable people
Sandra Cantu – homicide victim in 2009
Keyshia Cole - American singer, songwriter, actress, and television producer
Troy Dayak – soccer player/coach
Nick Eddy – former NFL player
Gilbert Fuentes – (born February 21, 2002) American professional soccer player for Austin Bold on loan from Major League Soccer San Jose Earthquakes.
MC Hammer – American rapper, dancer, entertainer, actor, business entrepreneur
Rod Lauren – singer/actor
Thia Megia – singer, finalist on American Idol season ten.
Matt Overton –  active NFL player- Jacksonville Jaguars
Bubba Paris - former NFL football star
Steve Perry – Singer from Journey (Banta)
Richard Pombo – former United States Representative
Saweetie - American rapper/songwriter
Keena Turner – football star

In popular culture
 Tracy was mentioned in Hunter S. Thompson's book Hell's Angels: The Strange and Terrible Saga of the Outlaw Motorcycle Gangs, because of the events at Altamont.  The concert was the subject of the 1970 documentary film Gimme Shelter.
 Tracy was mentioned in Jack Kerouac's book On the Road.
 The parade scene in the film The Candidate, starring Robert Redford, was filmed in Tracy.
The 1975 Academy Award-nominated documentary The California Reich depicts members of the American Nazi Party living in Tracy.
 The Tracy High School football field and MVP trophy are named after Peter B. Kyne, a novelist from San Francisco whose Bohemian Club friends orchestrated the naming in 1927, even though Kyne had very little to do with Tracy. It was renamed for long time Tracy High football coach Wayne Schneider in 2012 after the field was completely rebuilt.
 Kathy Griffin recorded her CD Kathy Griffin: For Your Consideration live on February 17, 2008, at the ETK Theatre at the Grand Theatre Center for the Arts in Tracy.
 In 2009, the city made national headlines because of a brutal crime, the body of 8-year-old Sandra Cantu was found  during routine draining of an irrigation pond. An autopsy established that Cantu had been beaten and sexually abused with a foreign object before being smothered, while toxicology results showed that she had ingested Alprazolam. Melissa Huckaby, a 28-year-old Sunday school teacher, was found guilty of her murder and was sentenced to life imprisonment without the possibility of parole.

Sister cities
Tracy has been a sister city of Memuro, Hokkaido since 1989.  The city is also a sister city of Velas in the Azores.

See also 

List of largest California cities by population

References

External links

Tracy Press website
Tracy Unified School District
Tracy Chamber of Commerce website
Railtown Tracy Project (San Joaquin Valley Railroad Museum)

 
Cities in San Joaquin County, California
Incorporated cities and towns in California
1910 establishments in California
Populated places established in 1910